James Byron Casey (born September 22, 1984) is a former American football tight end and fullback who is the tight ends coach for the Cincinnati Bengals of the National Football League (NFL). He was drafted by the Houston Texans in the fifth round of the 2009 NFL Draft and has also played for the Philadelphia Eagles and Denver Broncos of the National Football League (NFL). He played college football at Rice University and played baseball and football at Azle High School.

Personal life
Casey lost his mother at the age of 16, when a fire burned their home. He was only left with his backpack and the clothes he was wearing. He received support from citizens of Azle, Texas, who provided clothes, shelter and money to further his studies and his athletic career. He lived in various locations, with his older sister for a while, with his future wife’s family, with the trainer at Azle High School.

Casey is married to his high school sweetheart, Kylie, and has two sons with her.

Baseball career
Casey was drafted by the Chicago White Sox in the seventh round of the 2003 MLB Draft. He played in the White Sox organization for three years before retiring after 2006 to pursue a career in football.

College career
After retiring from baseball Casey chose to play college football at Rice University. As a freshman in 2007 Casey started four of 12 games recording 46 receptions for 585 yards and four touchdowns. He also had 144 rushing yards on 45 carries and five touchdowns as a running back and completed two of seven passes for 32 yards and an interception as a quarterback. He also played seven different positions in a game against Southern Mississippi.

As a sophomore in 2008 Casey started all 13 games at tight end earning third-team All-American and first-team All-Conference USA honors. He finished the season setting a single-season school record for receptions with 111 for 1,329 yards and 12 touchdowns. He also added 241 rushing yards on 57 carries and six touchdowns and completed two of five passes for five yards. Casey ended his collegiate career with NCAA tight end records for most passes caught in a season, most passes caught per game in a season, most yards gained in a season, and most yards per game in a season.

After his sophomore year Casey announced that he would enter the 2009 NFL Draft.

Casey graduated from Rice with a triple major in Economics, Sports Management, and Managerial Studies and a 3.84 GPA.

Professional career

Houston Texans
Casey was drafted by the Houston Texans in the fifth round of the 2009 NFL Draft. In his first game as starter, Casey caught three passes for 29 yards, but did not record a carry. In 2011, Casey was named the Texans starting fullback.

Philadelphia Eagles
Casey signed a three-year, $14.6 million contract with the Philadelphia Eagles on March 12, 2013. Casey was released by the Eagles on February 19, 2015.

Denver Broncos
Casey signed a one-year deal with the Broncos on April 11, 2015. He was reunited with his former Texans head coach, Gary Kubiak.

On October 9, 2015, Casey was released from the Broncos to make room for Derek Wolfe, who came off a four-game suspension.

Coaching career

University of Houston
On January 13, 2016, it was announced that Casey had joined the coaching staff of the Houston Cougars football team as an offensive analyst.

On December 22, 2016, was promoted to tight ends coach under new Houston head coach, Major Applewhite.

Cincinnati Bengals
On February 7, 2019 Casey was hired by the Bengals to be their tight ends coach.

References

External links

Rice Owls bio

1984 births
Living people
American football fullbacks
American football tight ends
Rice Owls football players
Houston Texans players
Philadelphia Eagles players
Denver Broncos players
Bristol White Sox players
Great Falls White Sox players
Laredo Broncos players
Fort Worth Cats players
All-American college football players
Players of American football from Fort Worth, Texas
Houston Cougars football coaches
People from Azle, Texas
Cincinnati Bengals coaches